Chailloué is a commune in the Orne department in north-western France. On 1 January 2016, the former communes Marmouillé and Neuville-près-Sées were merged into Chailloué.

See also
Communes of the Orne department

References

Communes of Orne